A post-legislative referendum was held in Scotland in 1979 to decide whether there was a sufficient support for a Scottish Assembly proposed in the Scotland Act 1978 among the Scottish electorate. This was an act to create a devolved deliberative assembly for Scotland. A majority (51.6%) of voters supported the proposal, but an amendment to the Act stipulated that it would be repealed if less than 40% of the total electorate voted in favour. As there was a turnout of 64% the "Yes" vote represented only 32.9% of the registered electorate, and the act was subsequently repealed.

A second referendum to create a devolved legislature in Scotland was held in 1997 under a newly elected Labour government, which led to the enactment of the Scotland Act 1998 and the creation of a devolved Scottish Parliament in 1999.

Background

Kilbrandon Commission
Following the Scottish National Party gaining its first peacetime MP in the 1967 Hamilton by-election and Plaid Cymru's first win at the 1966 Carmarthen by-election in Wales, the United Kingdom government set up the Royal Commission on the Constitution, referred to as the Kilbrandon Commission, in 1969. The royal commission was intended to look at the constitutional structure of the United Kingdom and consider changes that should be made. The final report was published in 1973.

The commission examined various models of devolution, federalism and confederalism, on top of the break-up of the UK into separate sovereign states.

In relation to Scotland, eight of the commission's members supported a Scottish Assembly, via a devolved structure. It would recommended that the assembly would have around 100 members, elected under single transferable vote from multi-member constituencies. The assembly would obtain powers in the areas of education, environment, health, home affairs, legal matters and social services, while agriculture, fisheries and food would be divided between the assembly and the UK government.

Previous Legislation
After returning to power with a minority government in February 1974 election, Harold Wilson's Labour government published a white paper entitled Democracy and Devolution: Proposals for Scotland and Wales, published in September 1974. The party gained a narrow majority of three seats in the election in October.

By 1976, the Labour government, now led by James Callaghan, had lost its parliamentary majority entirely following a series of adverse by-election results. To provide a stable majority in the House of Commons, the government made an agreement with the Scottish National Party and Plaid Cymru whereby, in return for their support in Commons votes, the government would instigate legislation to devolve political powers from Westminster to Scotland and Wales.

The Scotland and Wales Bill was subsequently introduced in November 1976, but the government struggled to get the legislation through parliament. The Conservative opposition opposed its second reading, and on the first day of committee 350 amendments were put down. Progress slowed to a crawl. In February 1977, the Bill's cabinet sponsor Michael Foot tabled a guillotine motion to attempt to halt the delays. The motion was rejected and the government was forced to withdraw the Bill.

Scotland Act 1978
The government returned to the issue of devolution in November 1977. Separate bills for Scotland and Wales were published and support from the Liberals was obtained. In spite of continued opposition requiring another guillotine motion, the Bills were passed. During the passage of the Scotland Act 1978 through Parliament, an amendment introduced by Labour MP George Cunningham added a requirement that the bill had to be approved by 40% of the total registered electorate, as well as a simple majority (50% + 1).

Proposed Assembly
Had the Scotland Act 1978 entered force, it would have created a Scottish Assembly with limited legislative powers. There would have been a Scottish Executive headed by a "First Secretary", taking over some of the functions of the Secretary of State for Scotland. Meetings of the Scottish Assembly would have been held at the Old Royal High School in Regent Road, Edinburgh. The former school hall was adapted for use by the Scottish Assembly, including the installation of microphones and new olive-green leather seating. Members would have been elected by the "first past the post" system.

The Scottish Assembly would have had the power to introduce primary legislation to be known as "Measures" (rather than Acts) within defined areas of competence. This form of legislation would not receive royal assent like Acts of Parliament do. Instead, the legislation is signed via an Order in Council, which the monarch signs and appends to the assembly measure once passed. Some new offices would have been created, such as a Comptroller and Auditor General for Scotland.

The areas of responsibility included:
Education
The environment
Health
Home affairs
Legal matters
Social services

Responsibility for agriculture, fisheries and food would have been divided between the Assembly and the United Kingdom government, while the latter would have retained control of electricity supply.

Opinion polling

Result

Aftermath
The result was a majority in favour of devolution. A total of 1,230,937 (51.6%) voted at the referendum in favour of an Assembly, a majority of about 77,400 over those voting against. However, this total represented only 32.9% of the registered electorate as a whole.  The Labour government held that the Act's requirements had not been met, and that devolution would therefore not be introduced for Scotland.

In the wake of the referendum the disappointed supporters of the bill conducted a protest campaign under the slogan "Scotland said 'yes, officially launched in a Glasgow hotel on 7 March 1979. In particular, the Scottish National Party (SNP) carried out a survey of the electoral register in the Edinburgh Central constituency. This appeared to show that the register was so out of date that even in an area where major support for a "yes" vote might be expected, achievement of 40% of the electorate was virtually unattainable. This was because the majority of electors lived in older tenements or newer Council blocks of flats where flat numbers were not specified. The work of electoral registration staff to obtain an accurate current register was almost impossible.

Under the terms of the Act, it could then be repealed by a Statutory instrument to be approved by Parliament. The government's decision to abandon devolution led the SNP to withdraw its support for the Labour government. It was in a minority in Parliament and had relied on deals with the smaller parties, including the SNP, for its survival. After establishing that the Liberals and the SNP would vote against the government in a confidence motion, the Conservative opposition tabled a motion on 28 March. The government was defeated by one vote, and a UK general election was subsequently called. This was won by the Conservatives, and Parliament voted to repeal the Act on 20 June 1979.

A second referendum to create a devolved legislature in Scotland was held in 1997 under a newly elected Labour government, which led to the enactment of the Scotland Act 1998 and the creation of a devolved Scottish Parliament in 1999.

See also
1997 Scottish devolution referendum
2014 Scottish independence referendum
Scottish independence
Referendums in the United Kingdom
Scottish Assembly
Royal Commission on the Constitution (United Kingdom)
1979 Welsh devolution referendum

Notes

References

External links
Chronology of Scottish Politics: The Devolution Years 1967–1979

Referendums in Scotland
1979 referendums
1979 elections in the United Kingdom
1979 in Scotland
1970s elections in Scotland
Scottish devolution
Autonomy referendums
March 1979 events in the United Kingdom